In geometry, the gyroelongated pentagonal cupola is one of the Johnson solids (J24). As the name suggests, it can be constructed by gyroelongating a pentagonal cupola (J5) by attaching a decagonal antiprism to its base. It can also be seen as a gyroelongated pentagonal bicupola (J46) with one pentagonal cupola removed.

Dual polyhedron 

The dual of the gyroelongated pentagonal cupola has 25 faces: 10 kites, 5 rhombi, and 10 pentagons.

External links
 

Johnson solids